The 2013–14 New Orleans Pelicans season was the franchise's 12th season in the National Basketball Association (NBA), and the first under the "Pelicans" name.

Key dates
June 27: The 2013 NBA draft took place at the Barclays Center in Brooklyn, New York.
July 1: 2013 NBA Free Agency begins.

Draft picks

Roster

Pre-season

|- style="background:#cfc;"
| 1 
| October 5
| @ Houston
| 
| Anthony Morrow (26)
| Arinze Onuaku (7)
| Austin Rivers (5)
| Toyota Center15,049
| 1–0
|- style="background:#cfc;"
| 2 
| October 7
| @ Dallas
| 
| Anthony Davis (25)
| Anthony Davis (7)
| Jrue Holiday (6)
| American Airlines Center15,082
| 2–0
|- style="background:#cfc;"
| 3 
| October 9
| @ Orlando
| 
| Anthony Davis (29)
| Anthony Davis (9)
| Jrue Holiday (9)
| Veterans Memorial Arena9,274
| 3–0
|- style="background:#cfc;"
| 4 
| October 13
| Atlanta
| 
| Anthony Davis (23)
| Anthony Davis (9)
| Brian Roberts (8)
| Mississippi Coast Coliseum3,956
| 4–0
|- style="background:#cfc;"
| 5 
| October 17
| @ Oklahoma City
| 
| Eric Gordon (21)
| Al-Farouq Aminu (10)
| Jrue Holiday (8)
| BOK Center17,778
| 5–0
|- style="background:#cfc;"
| 6 
| October 19
| Washington
| 
| Jrue Holiday (19)
| Jason Smith (9)
| Jrue Holiday (8)
| Rupp Arena14,980
| 6–0
|- style="background:#fcc;"
| 7 
| October 23
| Miami
| 
| Eric Gordon (19)
| Al-Farouq Aminu (9)
| Jrue Holiday (6)
| New Orleans Arena17,123
| 6–1
|- style="background:#cfc;"
| 8 
| October 25
| @ Orlando
| 
| Brian Roberts (21)
| Jeff Withey (5)
| Holiday, Evans, Roberts (3)
| Amway Center13,401
| 7–1

Regular season

Season standings

Game log

|- style="background:#fcc;"
| 1 
| October 30
| Indiana
| 
| Eric Gordon (25)
| Anthony Davis (12)
| Jrue Holiday (5)
| New Orleans Arena17,803
| 0–1

|- style="background:#fcc;"
| 2 
| November 1
| @ Orlando
| 
| Anthony Davis (26)
| Anthony Davis (17)
| Jrue Holiday (5)
| Amway Center18,846
| 0–2
|- style="background:#cfc;"
| 3 
| November 2
| Charlotte
| 
| Anthony Davis (25)
| Anthony Davis (8)
| Jrue Holiday (8)
| New Orleans Arena15,232
| 1–2
|- style="background:#fcc;"
| 4 
| November 5
| Phoenix
| 
| Eric Gordon (20)
| Anthony Davis (11)
| Jrue Holiday (9)
| New Orleans Arena13,404
| 1–3
|- style="background:#cfc;"
| 5 
| November 6
| @ Memphis
| 
| Eric Gordon (19)
| Anthony Davis (9)
| Tyreke Evans (4)
| FedExForum15,209
| 2–3
|- style="background:#cfc;"
| 6 
| November 8
| L.A. Lakers
| 
| Anthony Davis (32)
| Anthony Davis (12)
| Jrue Holiday (13)
| New Orleans Arena18,209
| 3–3
|- style="background:#fcc;"
| 7 
| November 10
| @ Phoenix
| 
| Jason Smith (22)
| Anthony Davis (12)
| Jrue Holiday (7)
| US Airways Center13,154
| 3–4
|- style="background:#fcc;"
| 8 
| November 12
| @ L.A. Lakers
| 
| Eric Gordon (17)
| Aminu, Davis, Withey (5)
| Tyreke Evans (6)
| Staples Center18,426
| 3–5
|- style="background:#fcc;"
| 9 
| November 13
| @ Utah
| 
| Anthony Davis (29)
| Anthony Davis (15)
| Jrue Holiday (6)
| EnergySolutions Arena16,717
| 3–6
|- style="background:#cfc;"
| 10 
| November 16
| Philadelphia
| 
| Ryan Anderson (26)
| Anthony Davis (9)
| Jrue Holiday (12)
| New Orleans Arena16,659
| 4–6
|- style="background:#cfc;"
| 11 
| November 20
| Utah
| 
| Anthony Davis (22)
| Anthony Davis (9)
| Aminu, Davis, Evans, Holiday, Rivers (4)
| New Orleans Arena13,203
| 5–6
|- style="background:#cfc;"
| 12 
| November 22
| Cleveland
| 
| Eric Gordon (19)
| Anthony Davis (13)
| Jrue Holiday (11)
| New Orleans Arena15,186
| 6–6
|- style="background:#fcc;"
| 13 
| November 25
| @ San Antonio
|  
| Ryan Anderson (17)
| Jrue Holiday (9)
| Jrue Holiday (7)
| AT&T Center18,323
| 6–7
|- style="background:#fcc;"
| 14 
| November 26
| Golden State
|  
| Ryan Anderson (21)
| Ryan Anderson (12)
| Eric Gordon (7)
| New Orleans Arena15,330
| 6–8
|- style="background:#cfc;"
| 15 
| November 29
| @ Philadelphia
|  
| Eric Gordon (26)
| Anthony Davis (10)
| Jrue Holiday (13)
| Wells Fargo Center17,807
| 7–8

|- style="background:#cfc;"
| 16 
| December 1
| @ New York
|  
| Ryan Anderson (31)
| Ryan Anderson (6)
| Jrue Holiday (9)
| Madison Square Garden19,812
| 8–8
|- style="background:#cfc;"
| 17 
| December 2
| @ Chicago
|  
| Ryan Anderson (36)
| Jason Smith (14)
| Jrue Holiday (12)
| United Center21,615
| 9–8
|- style="background:#fcc;"
| 18 
| December 4
| Dallas
| 
| Jrue Holiday (26)
| Al-Farouq Aminu (20)
| Jrue Holiday (9)
| New Orleans Arena14,524 
| 9–9
|- style="background:#fcc;"
| 19 
| December 6
| Oklahoma City
| 
| Ryan Anderson (18)
| Jason Smith (12)
| Jrue Holiday (6)
| New Orleans Arena17,694 
| 9–10
|- style="background:#cfc;"
| 20 
| December 11
| Detroit
| 
| Anderson, Smith  (22)
| Jason Smith (16)
| Jrue Holiday (8) 
| New Orleans Arena14,517 
| 10–10
|- style="background:#cfc;"
| 21 
| December 13
| Memphis
| 
| Eric Gordon (25)
| Anderson, Amundson (14)
| Jrue Holiday (12)
| New Orleans Arena15,516 
| 11–10
|- style="background:#fcc;"
| 22 
| December 15
| @ Denver
| 
| Ryan Anderson (26)
| Lou Amundson (8)
| Jrue Holiday (7) 
| Pepsi Center15,111 
| 11–11
|- style="background:#fcc;"
| 23 
| December 17
| @ Golden State
| 
| Ryan Anderson (21)
| Al-Farouq Aminu (8)
| Jrue Holiday (6)
| Oracle Arena19,596 
| 11–12
|- style="background:#fcc;"
| 24 
| December 18
| @ L.A. Clippers
| 
| Anthony Davis (22)
| Tyreke Evans (13)
| Holiday & Evans (10)
| Staples Center19,060 
| 11–13
|- style="background:#fcc;"
| 25 
| December 21
| @ Portland
|  
| Anthony Davis (21)
| Alexis Ajinça (11)
| Jrue Holiday (7)
| Moda Center20,027
| 11–14
|- style="background:#cfc;"
| 26 
| December 23
| @ Sacramento
| 
| Tyreke Evans (25)
| Anthony Davis (11)
| Tyreke Evans (12)
| Sleep Train Arena17,317
| 12–14
|- style="background:#cfc;"
| 27 
| December 27
| Denver
| 
| Tyreke Evans (19)
| Ryan Anderson (10)
| Tyreke Evans (10)
| New Orleans Arena18,089
| 13–14
|- style="background:#fcc;"
| 28 
| December 28
| @ Houston
| 
| Ryan Anderson (22)
| Anthony Davis (16)
| Jrue Holiday & Tyreke Evans (9)
| Toyota Center18,233
| 13–15
|- style="background:#cfc;"
| 29 
| December 30
| Portland
| 
| Jrue Holiday (31)
| Al-Farouq Aminu (15)
| Jrue Holiday (13)
| New Orleans Arena17,035
| 14–15

|- style="background:#fcc;"
| 30 
| January 1
| @ Minnesota
| 
| Ryan Anderson (25)
| Tyreke Evans (7)
| Jrue Holiday (5)
| Target Center14,002
| 14–16
|- style="background:#cfc;"
| 31 
| January 3
| @ Boston
| 
| Anthony Davis (23)
| Anthony Davis (9)
| Tyreke Evans (6)
| TD Garden18,624
| 15–16
|- style="background:#fcc;"
| 32 
| January 4
| @ Indiana
| 
| Eric Gordon (21)
| Anthony Davis (8)
| Jrue Holiday (7)
| Bankers Life Fieldhouse18,165
| 15–17
|- style="background:#fcc;"
| 33 
| January 7
| @ Miami
| 
| Anthony Davis (22)
| Anthony Davis (12)
| Jrue Holiday (7)
| American Airlines Arena20,097
| 15–18
|- style="background:#fcc;"
| 34 
| January 8
| Washington
| 
| Eric Gordon (23)
| Anthony Davis (7)
| Tyreke Evans (5)
| New Orleans Arena17,557
| 15–19
|- style="background:#fcc;"
| 35 
| January 10
| Dallas
| 
| Eric Gordon (27)
| Anthony Davis (13)
| Austin Rivers (4)
| New Orleans Arena16,533
| 15–20
|- style="background:#fcc;"
| 36 
| January 11
| @ Dallas
| 
| Anthony Davis (28)
| Anthony Davis (14)
| Brian Roberts (8)
| American Airlines Center20,116
| 15–21
|- style="background:#fcc;"
| 37 
| January 13
| San Antonio
| 
| Anthony Davis (22)
| Al-Farouq Aminu (13)
| Austin Rivers (5)
| New Orleans Arena15,552
| 15–22
|- style="background:#fcc;"
| 38 
| January 15
| Houston
| 
| Eric Gordon (35)
| Al-Farouq Aminu (8)
| Eric Gordon (6)
| New Orleans Arena15,918
| 15–23
|- style="background:#fcc;"
| 39 
| January 18
| Golden State
| 
| Anthony Davis (31)
| Anthony Davis (17)
| Eric Gordon (6)
| New Orleans Arena18,045
| 15–24
|- style="background:#cfc;"
| 40 
| January 20
| @ Memphis
| 
| Anthony Davis (27)
| Anthony Davis (10)
| Tyreke Evans (7)
| FedExForum17,485
| 16–24
|- style="background:#fcc;"
| 41 
| January 21
| Sacramento
| 
| Tyreke Evans (17)
| Anthony Davis (6)
| Brian Roberts (6)
| New Orleans Arena16,459
| 16–25
|- style="background:#cfc;"
| 42 
| January 24
| @ Detroit
| 
| Anthony Morrow (21)
| Anthony Davis (8)
| three players (3)
| Palace of Auburn Hills14,107
| 17–25
|- style="background:#cfc;"
| 43 
| January 26
| Orlando
| 
| Tyreke Evans (23)
| Anthony Davis (19)
| Tyreke Evans (7)
| New Orleans Arena17,197
| 18–25
|- style="background:#cfc;"
| 44 
| January 28
| @ Cleveland
| 
| Anthony Davis (30)
| Greg Stiemsma (11)
| Eric Gordon (9)
| Quicken Loans Arena13,985
| 19–25
|- style="background:#fcc;"
| 45 
| January 29
| @ Minnesota
| 
| Al-Farouq Aminu (18)
| Al-Farouq Aminu & Greg Stiemsma (12)
| Brian Roberts (basketball) & Tyreke Evans (3)
| Target Center11,702
| 19–26

|- style="background:#cfc;"
| 46 
| February 1
| Chicago
| 
| Anthony Davis (24)
| Anthony Davis (8)
| Tyreke Evans (6)
| New Orleans Arena17,799
| 20–26
|- style="background:#fcc;"
| 47 
| February 3
| San Antonio
| 
| Anthony Morrow (20)
| Anthony Davis (16)
| Austin Rivers (5)
| New Orleans Arena17,086
| 20–27
|- style="background:#cfc;"
| 48 
| February 5
| Atlanta
| 
| Anthony Davis (27)
| Anthony Davis (10)
| Brian Roberts (6)
| New Orleans Arena16,232
| 21–27
|- style="background:#cfc;"
| 49 
| February 7
| Minnesota
| 
| Anthony Davis (26)
| Anthony Davis (10)
| Brian Roberts (6)
| Smoothie King Center16,541
| 22–27
|- style="background:#fcc;"
| 50 
| February 9
| @ Brooklyn
| 
| Anthony Davis (24)
| Anthony Davis (9)
| Austin Rivers (5)
| Barclays Center17,732
| 22–28
|- style="background:#fcc;"
| 51 
| February 10
| @ Toronto
| 
| Tyreke Evans (23)
| Anthony Davis (7)
| Tyreke Evans (10)
| Air Canada Centre17,596
| 22–29
|- style="background:#cfc;"
| 52 
| February 12
| @ Milwaukee
| 
| Eric Gordon (21)
| Alexis Ajinca (9)
| Eric Gordon (6)
| BMO Harris Bradley Center11,012
| 23–29
|- align="center"
|colspan="9" bgcolor="#bbcaff"|All-Star Break
|- style="background:#fcc;"
| 53 
| February 19
| New York
| 
| Eric Gordon (28)
| Anthony Davis (10)
| Brian Roberts (4)
| Smoothie King Center
| 23–30
|- style="background:#fcc;"
| 54 
| February 21
| @ Charlotte
| 
| Brian Roberts (20)
| Anthony Davis (13)
| Tyreke Evans (7)
| Time Warner Cable Arena15,867
| 23–31
|- style="background:#fcc;"
| 55 
| February 22
| @ Washington
| 
| Anthony Davis (26)
| Anthony Davis (11)
| Brian Roberts (9)
| Verizon Center18,385
| 23–32
|- style="background:#fcc;"
| 56 
| February 24
| L.A. Clippers
| 
| Anthony Davis (26)
| Alexis Ajinca (12)
| Brian Roberts (7)
| Smoothie King Center16,185
| 23–33
|- style="background:#fcc;"
| 57 
| February 26
| @ Dallas
| 
| Eric Gordon (19)
| Anthony Davis (9)
| Tyreke Evans (7)
| American Airlines Center19,729
| 23–34
|- style="background:#fcc;"
| 58 
| February 28
| @ Phoenix
| 
| Anthony Davis (32)
| Anthony Davis (9)
| Evans, Gordon & Roberts (4)
| US Airways Center16,578
| 23–35

|- style="background:#fcc;"
| 59 
| March 1
| @ L.A. Clippers
| 
| Tyreke Evans (22)
| Alexis Ajinca (10)
| Tyreke Evans (5)
| Staples Center19,060
| 23–36
|- style="background:#fcc;"
| 60 
| March 3
| @ Sacramento
| 
| Tyreke Evans (27)
| Tyreke Evans (10)
| Tyreke Evans (8)
| Sleep Train Arena16,225
| 23–37
|- style="background:#cfc;"
| 61 
| March 4
| @ L.A. Lakers
| 
| Gordon & Davis (28)
| Anthony Davis (15)
| Tyreke Evans (11)
| Staples Center18,436
| 24–37
|- style="background:#cfc;"
| 62 
| March 7
| Milwaukee
| 
| Anthony Davis (29)
| Anthony Davis (10)
| Anthony Davis (14)
| Smoothie King Center16,061
| 25–37
|- style="background:#cfc;"
| 63 
| March 9
| Denver
| 
| Anthony Davis (32)
| Anthony Davis (17)
| Roberts & Rivers (5)
| Smoothie King Center17,115
| 26–37
|- style="background:#fcc;"
| 64 
| March 12
| Memphis
| 
| Anthony Davis (29)
| Anthony Davis (10)
| Austin Rivers (9)
| Smoothie King Center16,513
| 26–38
|- style="background:#fcc;"
| 65 
| March 14
| Portland
| 
| Anthony Davis (36)
| Anthony Davis (9)
| Tyreke Evans (8)
| Smoothie King Center16,913
| 26–39
|- style="background:#cfc;"
| 66 
| March 16
| Boston
| 
| Anthony Davis (40)
| Anthony Davis (21)
| Eric Gordon (8)
| Smoothie King Center17,050
| 27–39
|- style="background:#fcc;"
| 67 
| March 19
| Toronto
| 
| Al-Farouq Aminu (19)
| Al-Farouq Aminu (10)
| Tyreke Evans (3)
| Smoothie King Center15,282
| 27–40
|- style="background:#cfc;"
| 68 
| March 21
| @ Atlanta
| 
| Anthony Davis (34)
| Anthony Davis (11)
| Brian Roberts (5)
| Philips Arena15,476
| 28–40
|- style="background:#cfc;"
| 69 
| March 22
| Miami
| 
| Anthony Davis (30)
| Anthony Davis (11)
| Tyreke Evans (8)
| Smoothie King Center18,185
| 29–40
|- style="background:#cfc;"
| 70 
| March 24
| Brooklyn
| 
| Tyreke Evans (33)
| Anthony Davis (14)
| Tyreke Evans (7)
| Smoothie King Center14,599
| 30–40
|- style="background:#cfc;"
| 71 
| March 26
| L.A. Clippers
| 
| Anthony Morrow (27)
| Anthony Davis (13)
| Tyreke Evans (9)
| Smoothie King Center16,363
| 31–40
|- style="background:#cfc;"
| 72 
| March 28
| Utah
| 
| Tyreke Evans (22)
| Alexis Ajinça (10)
| Tyreke Evans (15)
| Smoothie King Center17,699
| 32–40
|- style="background:#fcc;"
| 73 
| March 29
| @ San Antonio
| 
| Brian Roberts (18)
| Al-Farouq Aminu (10)
| Brian Roberts (5)
| AT&T Center18,581
| 32–41
|- style="background:#fcc;"
| 74 
| March 31
| Sacramento
| 
| Anthony Morrow (23)
| Anthony Davis (8)
| Austin Rivers (9)
| Smoothie King Center15,548
| 32–42

|- style="background:#fcc;"
| 75 
| April 2
| @ Denver
| 
| Tyreke Evans (27)
| Tyreke Evans (8)
| Brian Roberts (6)
| Pepsi Center14,783
| 32–43
|- style="background:#fcc;"
| 76 
| April 4
| @ Utah
| 
| Anthony Morrow (26)
| Davis & Stiemsma (6)
| Brian Roberts (6)
| EnergySolutions Arena19,681
| 32–44
|- style="background:#fcc;"
| 77 
| April 6
| @ Portland
| 
| Anthony Morrow (17)
| Al-Farouq Aminu (9)
| Tyreke Evans (8)
| Moda Center20,036
| 32–45
|- style="background:#fcc;"
| 78 
| April 9
| Phoenix
| 
| Jeff Withey (17)
| Evans & Stiemsma (8)
| Austin Rivers (8)
| Smoothie King Center16,256
| 32–46
|- style="background:#fcc;"
| 79 
| April 11
| @ Oklahoma City
| 
| Miller & Rivers (18)
| Austin Rivers (8)
| Tyreke Evans (6)
| Chesapeake Energy Arena18,203
| 32–47
|- style="background:#fcc;"
| 80 
| April 12
| @ Houston
| 
| Luke Babbitt (24)
| Austin Rivers (10)
| Austin Rivers (6)
| Toyota Center18,372
| 32–48
|- style="background:#cfc;"
| 81 
| April 14
| Oklahoma City
| 
| Tyreke Evans (41)
| Tyreke Evans (9)
| Tyreke Evans (8)
| Smoothie King Center17,024
| 33–48
|- style="background:#cfc;"
| 82 
| April 16
| Houston
| 
| Tyreke Evans (25)
| Luke Babbitt (8)
| Tyreke Evans (10)
| Smoothie King Center17,421
| 34–48

Player statistics

Transactions

New Orleans
New Orleans Pelicans seasons
2013 in sports in Louisiana
2014 in sports in Louisiana